Gullsteinen is a large hill in the city of Bergen in Vestland county, Norway. It is part of the Løvstakken mountain massif.

See also
List of mountains of Norway

References

Mountains of Bergen